Sjödiken is a locality situated in Svedala Municipality, Skåne County, Sweden with 438 inhabitants in 2010.

References 

Populated places in Svedala Municipality
Populated places in Skåne County